Fongueusemare is a commune in the Seine-Maritime department in the Normandy region in northern France.

Geography

Heraldry

Population

Places of interest
 The chapel of Sainte-Thérèse, built in 1927.

In fiction and popular culture
Much of the action in André Gide's book Strait Is the Gate is set in the home of the Bucolin family at Fongueusemare.

See also
Communes of the Seine-Maritime department

References

External links

Communes of Seine-Maritime